Gobersa is a genus of flies belonging to the family Lesser Dung flies.

Species
G. leleupi de Coninck, 1983

References

Sphaeroceridae
Diptera of Africa
Brachycera genera